6th World Soundtrack Awards
October 14, 2006

Best Original Soundtrack:
 The Constant Gardener
The 6th World Soundtrack Awards were given on 14 October 2006 in Ghent, Belgium.

Winners
Soundtrack Composer of the Year:
Alberto Iglesias for The Constant Gardener
Best Original Soundtrack of the Year:
Alberto Iglesias for The Constant Gardener
Best Original Song Written for a Film:
"Our Town" from Cars
Public Choice Award:
Gustavo Santaolalla for Brokeback Mountain
Discovery of the Year:
Evanthia Reboutsika - My Father and My Son
Lifetime Achievement Award:
Peer Raben

Nominees
Soundtrack Composer of the Year: 
Danny Elfman - Charlie and the Chocolate Factory 
Alberto Iglesias - The Constant Gardener 
Dario Marianelli - Pride & Prejudice 
James Newton Howard - King Kong 
John Powell - Ice Age: The Meltdown
Best Original Soundtrack of the Year: 
Brokeback Mountain - Gustavo Santaolalla 
King Kong - James Newton Howard 
Munich - John Williams 
Pride & Prejudice - Dario Marianelli 
The Constant Gardener - Alberto Iglesias
Best Original Song Written for Film: 
"A Love That Will Never Grow Old" - Brokeback Mountain
Music by Gustavo Santaolalla
Performed by Emmylou Harris 
Lyrics by Bernie Taupin
"Can't Take It In" - The Chronicles of Narnia: The Lion, the Witch, and the Wardrobe 
Music by Harry Gregson-Williams and Imogen Heap 
Performed by Imogen Heap 
Lyrics by Imogen Heap
"Magic Works" - Harry Potter and the Goblet of Fire 
Music and lyrics by Jarvis Cocker
Performed by Jarvis Cocker, Jonny Greenwood, Philip Selway, Steve Mackey, Steve Claydon and Jason Buckle 
String arrangement by Patrick Doyle 
"Mdlwembe" - Tsotsi 
Music by Kabelo Ikaneng
Performed by Zola 
Lyrics by Zola
"Our Town" - Cars
Music and lyrics by Randy Newman
Performed by James Taylor
Discovery of the year:
Nick Cave and Warren Ellis- The Proposition
Nigel Clarke and Michael CsaniI-Wills - The Thief Lord
Olivier Florio - Les Brigades du Tigre
Douglas Pipes - Monster House
Evanthia Reboutsika]] - My Father & my son

References 

0
2006 film awards
2006 music awards